Dibernardia is a genus of snakes of the family Colubridae.

Species
 Dibernardia affinis (Günther, 1858)
 Dibernardia bilineata (Fischer, 1885)
 Dibernardia persimilis (Cope, 1869)
 Dibernardia poecilopogon (Cope, 1863)

References 

Dibernardia
Snake genera